The Battle is an album by American country music artist George Jones released in 1976 on the Epic Records label.

Recording and composition
The Battle was Jones's second album following his divorce from Tammy Wynette and continued his mid-seventies commercial slide.  Although it did slightly better than his previous album Memories of Us on the Billboard country album charts, reaching number 36, it was a far cry from what the singer had been accustomed to.  Despite the absence of a hit single, Jones's singing is characteristically impeccable, especially on the title track, which peaked at number 14 on the singles chart.  Roy Kasten of Amazon.com argues, "The extended metaphor of "The Battle," in which satin gowns become armor and tears deadly weapons, would be absurd in most hands; yet the story of a marriage disintegrating into war, but somehow finding peace, becomes transcendent in the hands of Jones..."  The singer gives an equally moving vocal on David Allan Coe's "I Still Sing The Old Songs", which is topped off by producer Billy Sherrill having a lone violin playing "The Red River Valley" on the outro.  The Battle also includes a song Jones wrote with Wynette called "Wean Me", in which Jones begs an unnamed woman to "Take this bottle from my hand" and laments his "childish ways," lines that may have been all too prescient for Wynette.  In the liner notes to the 1999 reissue of the LP, Wynette is quoted, "It's funny, George and I have lived our life in our music. It's all there...the fans don't have to ask."

Reception
Thom Jurek of AllMusic calls The Battle "a gorgeous record" and contends that "while its title suggested a concept album, it is anything but. In fact, it's an exercise in the conflict of emotions from sadness and loss, denial, anger, and grace. And everything here is a love song."

Track listing 
 "The Battle" (Norro Wilson, George Richey, Linda Kimball)
 "I Can't Get Over What Lovin' You Has Done" (Jody Emerson)
 "Baby, There's Nothing Like You" (George Jones, Earl Montgomery)
 "You Always Look Your Best (Here in My Arms)" (Curly Putman, Mike Kosser, Steve Pippin)
 "Nighttime (And My Baby)" (Norro Wilson, Carmol Taylor, Joe Stampley)
 "I'll Come Back" (Earl Montgomery)
 "Wean Me" (Jones, Tammy Wynette)
 "Love Coming Down" (Jerry Chesnut)
 "Billy Ray Wrote a Song" (Hank Cochran, Glenn Martin)
 "I Still Sing the Old Songs" (David Allan Coe)

References

External links
 George Jones' Official Website
 Record Label

1976 albums
George Jones albums
Albums produced by Billy Sherrill
Epic Records albums